SuperClash IV was the fourth and final SuperClash professional wrestling Supercard event promoted by the American Wrestling Association (AWA) and was held at the Saint Paul Civic Center in St. Paul, Minnesota on April 8, 1990. In September 2019 the event was added to the WWE Network as a hidden gem.

Seven matches were contested at the event. In the main event, The Trooper and Paul Diamond defeated The Destruction Crew (Mike Enos and Wayne Bloom) in a steel cage match. Also at the event, Larry Zbyszko defeated the defending champion Mr. Saito to win the AWA World Heavyweight Championship, with Nick Bockwinkel serving as the special guest referee.

Results

See also
1990 in professional wrestling

References

SuperClash
1990 in professional wrestling
Events in Saint Paul, Minnesota
Professional wrestling in Saint Paul, Minnesota
1990 in Minnesota